The Menorca football team represents Menorca, an island of Balearic Islands Autonomous Community of Spain. They are not affiliated with FIFA or UEFA, because it is represented internationally by the Spain national football team. It only plays friendly matches. Menorca is a member of the International Island Games Association and has taken part in Football at the Island Games.

Selected internationals

References

External links 
Menorca results on Roon Ba

Football team
Menorca
Football clubs in the Balearic Islands